Madan Mohan is a form of the Hindu god, Krishna.
Krishna is celebrated as Madan Mohan, who mesmerizes everyone. His consort, Radha is glorified as Madan Mohan's Mohini, who can even mesmerise Madan Mohan (her Kahn). Radha is known as the mediator without whom access to Krishna is not possible.

Originally from Shri Vrindavan, Madan Mohan ji went to Amer in Jaipur with Raja Sawai Jai Singh II — the founder of Jaipur and from there was brought to Karauli in Rajasthan by Maharaj Gopal Singh after he conquered the battle of Daulatabad.

References 

Forms of Krishna
Swaminarayan Sampradaya